Innerwick railway station served the village of Innerwick, East Lothian, Scotland from 1848 to 1964 on the East Coast Main Line.

History 
The station opened in July 1848 by the North British Railway. It closed to passengers on 18 June 1951 and closed to goods traffic on 10 August 1964. The line is still open and the former site is now a large field with a cabbage patch and a line house.

References

External links 

1849 establishments in Scotland
1951 disestablishments in Scotland
Former North British Railway stations
Railway stations in Great Britain opened in 1846
Railway stations in Great Britain closed in 1964